Mais ou et donc Ornicar is a 1979 French drama film directed by Bertrand Van Effenterre. The film stars Geraldine Chaplin and Brigitte Fossey. It was released in France on 28 February, 1979.

Plot
Isabelle (Chaplin) and Anne (Fossey) are two young women that are looking to strike out, find their own identities independent of men. They look for this fulfillment in their professional lives, as one directs a video production unit for sociological research and the other becomes a garage mechanic. However her success at the garage means she has little time to spend with her husband and child. Meanwhile the sociologist  becomes disillusioned by the communication gap she senses in the workplace. Her mechanic friend continues to struggle with her work-life balance and comes to realise how important family is in her life.

Cast
Geraldine Chaplin as Isabelle
Brigitte Fossey as Anne
Jean-François Stévenin as Michel
Didier Flamand as Philippe
Jean-Jacques Biraud as Vincent
Anna Prucnal as Agnès

References

External links
 
 "Mais ou et donc Ornicar (1978) Bertrand Van Effenterre", Cinémathèque Française

1979 films
Films directed by Bertrand Van Effenterre
French drama films
1970s French films